Lanmei Airlines (Cambodia) Co., Ltd is a hybrid airline registered in Cambodia.

Lanmei Airlines and Cambodian MJ Airlines signed a strategic cooperation agreement in November 2018.

History
Based in Phnom Penh and Siem Reap, Lanmei Airlines is a local Cambodia air transport company. "Lanmei" is an abbreviation for the Lancang-Mekong River. The Lancang River originates in Southwest China and becomes known as Mekong as it flows through Burma, Laos, Thailand, Cambodia, and Vietnam and into the South China Sea.

The company plans to operate scheduled passenger services from Phnom Penh, using A320s Family. The start-up received in-principle approval from the Cambodian government. Lanmei Airlines commenced four times weekly Phnom Penh-Hanoi and Phnom Penh-Siem Reap-Ho Chi Minh City services on 15 September 2017 and three times weekly Phnom Penh-Siem Reap-Macau-Phnom Penh service on 16 September 2017. In the Coronavirus period, Lanmei Airlines Flew to Kathmandu, Islamabad, Lahore, New Delhi, and Yangon.

Destinations
Lanmei Airlines serves the following destinations:

Fleet

As of February 2023, the Lanmei Airlines fleet consists of the following aircraft:

Former aircraft

 3 Airbus A319-100 - 2 are operated by Royal Air Philippines, while 1 is stored at Pinal Airpark
 4 Airbus A320-200 - 3 are active, while XY-AGO was broken up in 2021

See also
 List of airlines of Cambodia
 Transport in Cambodia

References

External links

Airlines established in 2016
Airlines of Cambodia
Low-cost carriers
Cambodian brands
Cambodian companies established in 2016